USCGC Gallatin has been the name of more than one ship of the United States Coast Guard:

 , a patrol boat in commission in the Coast Guard from 1926 to 1935
 , a high endurance cutter in commission in the Coast Guard from 1968 to 2014 and in the Nigerian Navy since 2017

See also
 , for United States Revenue Cutter Service ships

United States Coast Guard ship names